Build Me Up From Bones is the third studio album by American folk and bluegrass singer-songwriter Sarah Jarosz, released on September 24, 2013 on Sugar Hill Records. It was recorded and mixed at Minutia Studios in Nashville, Tennessee, by Gary Paczosa. This is the third studio collaboration between Jarosz and Paczosa. Build Me Up from Bones was nominated for Best Folk Album at the 56th Annual Grammy Awards, and its title track was nominated for Best American Roots Song.

Track listing

Charts

Top Folk Albums – #19
Americana – #1
FMQB Top 200 – #159
FMQB Non-Comm – #20

Reception
"Build Me Up From Bones is an organic masterwork for Jarosz, a warm, nuanced collection that wraps and enchants the listener. If you're curious what brilliant natural talent paired with an ongoing commitment to learn and grow can produce, Sarah Jarosz's latest is a perfect example." – Stereo Subversion

"With Build Me Up From Bones (Sugar Hill) her third album, she moves past precocity toward the full bloom of artistry: the singing is more deeply self-assured, and the songs are grounded in truer emotional terrain." – The New York Times

"Her latest is more organic, a trio setting that emphasizes the value of space. The songs breathe. From the perspective of composition and structure, the music is more complex and nuanced, too. Jarosz's voice, warm and elastic, rings out strong and clear." – The Boston Globe

Personnel
 Sarah Jarosz – vocals on all tracks

"Over the Edge"
 Sarah Jarosz – octave mandolin
 Jedd Hughes – harmony vocal, guitar
 Dan Dugmore – lap steel
 Viktor Krauss – bass
 Eric Darken – percussion

"Fuel the Fire"
 Sarah Jarosz – banjo
 Darrell Scott – harmony vocal
 Alex Hargreaves – violin
 Nathaniel Smith – violin
 Chris Thile – mandolin
 Viktor Krauss – bass

"Mile on the Moon"
 Sarah Jarosz – octave mandolin
 Jedd Hughes – harmony vocal, guitar
 Dirk Powell – accordion
 Dan Dugmore – electric guitar
 Viktor Krauss – bass
 Eric Darken – percussion

"Build Me Up From Bones"
 Sarah Jarosz – octave mandolin
 Aoife O'Donovan – harmony vocal
 Alex Hargreaves – violin
 Nathaniel Smith – cello

"Dark Road"
 Sarah Jarosz – guitar
 Kai Welch – harmony vocal
 Jerry Douglas – Dobro 
 Darrell Scott – electric guitar
 Viktor Krauss – bass
 Kenny Malone – percussion

"Simple Twist of Fate"
 Nathaniel Smith – cello

"1,000 Things"
 Sarah Jarosz – guitar
 Alex Hargreaves – violin
 Nathaniel Smith – cello
 Kenny Malone – percussion

"Gone Too Soon"
 Sarah Jarosz – octave mandolin
 Kate Rusby – harmony vocal
 Jerry Douglas – Weissenborn 
 Darrell Scott – guitar
 Dirk Powell – bass
 Kenny Malone – percussion

"Anything Else"
 Sarah Jarosz – guitar
 Alex Hargreaves – violin
 Nathaniel Smith – cello

"The Book of Right-On"
 Sarah Jarosz – mandolin
 Alex Hargreaves – violin
 Nathaniel Smith – cello

"Rearrange the Art"
 Sarah Jarosz – banjo
 Aoife O'Donovan – harmony vocal
 Alex Hargreaves – violin
 Nathaniel Smith – cello
 Dan Dugmore – pedal steel
 Tim Lauer –  Wurlitzer 

Production
 Produced by Gary Paczosa and Sarah Jarosz
 Recorded and Mixed by Gary Paczosa at Minutia Studios, Nashville, Tennessee
 Additional engineering: Shani Gandhi and Brandon Bell
 Mastered by Eric Boulanger at The Mastering Lab, Ojai, California

References

2013 albums
Sarah Jarosz albums
Sugar Hill Records albums